The Wexner Graduate Fellowship Program supports graduate students planning a career related to Judaism.   The program selects 20 students preparing for careers in the rabbinate, the cantorate, academic Jewish studies, and Jewish communal service.  Wexner Graduate Fellowships are given to students who are strongly committed to the Jewish community, have exceptional academic records, and show potential to become leaders.  

Each fellow receives $20,000 a year for up to three years to finance their education. Fellows participate in annual institutes where leadership seminars enhance the skills of emerging Jewish professionals.  Graduate Fellowship Alumni continue meeting and building a network throughout their careers.

Applicants for Wexner Graduate Fellowships represent an elite group within the American Jewish community.  They are the most accomplished candidates for professional Jewish leadership training in North America.

References

External links
 

Fellowships
Judaic studies
Jewish organizations based in the United States